Elavally is a village in Thrissur district in the state of Kerala, India. The village is a part of Elavally Grama Panchayat and Mullassery Block Panchayat.

It includes the places of:

 Elavally North, is lying in between Kadavalloor on the north, Parakad on the east, Elavally South on the south and Chittaattukara on the west. It is occupied with an excellent Durga Temple, having self installed growing granite statue.
 Cheloor, is north eastern part of Parakad, is a hilly area. ചേലൂർക്കുന്ന്, alias चेलपुराचलः or the Cheloor hills is occupied with an excellent Ayyappa Temple.
 Parakad, is dominant with rice fields and hilly area.
 Vaaka, is coming south to Cheluur and south-east to Parakad having rice fields and vegetative lands.
 Elavally South, is surrounded by Peruvalloor, Elavally North, Vaka and Pandarakad.
 Pandarakad, is surrounded with Elavally North, Thaamarappilli, Elavally and kadavalloor

Demographics
 India census, Elavally had a population of 11665 with 5398 males and 6267 females.

References

Villages in Thrissur district